Morey is a commune in the Saône-et-Loire department in the region of Bourgogne-Franche-Comté in eastern France.

Geography
Morey is located in the hills surrounding the Dheune river and the Canal Du Centre. In addition to the main village, several hamlets are also parts of Morey:
 Fangey-le-bas
 Fangey-le-haut
 Baugey
 Nuit

The village is surrounded by the communes of Châtel-Moron, Essertenne, Villeneuve-en-Montagne, Saint-Bérain-sur-Dheune, Saint-Julien-sur-Dheune.

History
Anciently named "Moreyurn", the village was a dependency of the baron of Couches.

See also
Communes of the Saône-et-Loire department

References

Communes of Saône-et-Loire